Taijul Islam (Bengali: তাইজুল ইসলাম; born 7 February 1992) is a Bangladeshi left-arm orthodox spinner who plays for the Bangladesh national cricket team. He made his international debut for Bangladesh in September 2014.

Taijul was selected for Bangladesh A after a strong 2013–14 domestic season, and went on to make his Test debut for Bangladesh on its 2014 tour of the West Indies. He took a five-wicket haul on debut, and, when Zimbabwe toured Bangladesh later in the year, took figures of 8/39, the best figures by any Bangladeshi at Test level. He made his ODI debut later in the series, and took a hat-trick, becoming the first ever player to do so on debut.

Domestic career
Taijul has played at domestic level for Rajshahi Division and North Zone, in the Bangladesh Premier League (BPL) for Duronto Rajshahi, and in the Dhaka Premier Division for Prime Doleshwar SC. He made his first-class debut for Rajshahi Division during the 2010–11 season of the National Cricket League.

Taijul initially played in his hometown, Natore, before moving up to the Rajshahi Division league system. He toured Sri Lanka with the Bangladesh national under-19s during the 2009 season, and played three under-19 One Day Internationals and one under-19 Test. Taijul made his first-class debut for Rajshahi Division in April 2011, during the 2010–11 season of the National Cricket League (Bangladesh). He played three matches late in the season, taking 14 wickets (including three four-wicket hauls). This impressed Khaled Mashud, a former captain of Bangladesh and leading figure in the Rajshahi team, and reputedly guaranteed his place in the squad for several seasons.

For the 2011–12 season, Taijul secured a place with Prime Doleshwar Sporting Club in the Dhaka Premier Division, which, although it did not yet have list-A status, was one of the strongest one-day leagues in the country. He was also signed to Duronto Rajshahi for the inaugural season of the Bangladesh Premier League, playing three matches, including the team's semi-final loss to the Barisal Burners. Taijul gained more game time during the following season, taking nine wickets from nine matches. Following on from this, in August 2013 he represented the Bangladesh under-23 side at the ACC Emerging Teams Cup in Singapore, which constituted his first matches at list-A level. The Dhaka Premier Division gained list-A status for its 2013 season, running from September to November, and Taijul was one of the competition's leading wicket-takers, finishing with 22 wickets from 15 matches (behind only Farhad Reza for Prime Doleshwar). This including figures of 6/19 against Sheikh Jamal Dhanmondi Club (led by Mushfiqur Rahim), a personal best.

Taijul represented another side sponsored by Prime Bank Limited in a brief Victory Day Cup series at the end of December 2013. He played seven games in that competition, which was his second Twenty20 tournament of the year – he had also represented Rajshahi Division at the Bangladesh Games in April. The 2013–14 season was Taijul's breakout season at first-class level. In the four-zone Bangladesh Cricket League, he took 37 wickets in four matches for North Zone, an amalgam of the Rajshahi and Rangpur Division teams. This included match figures of 12/122 (7/71 and 5/51) against East Zone, the first ten-wicket haul of his career. Against Central Zone, Taijul took match figures of 11/177 (5/88 and 6/89), while in the tournament's final, against South Zone, he took 10/242, which included first-innings figures of 8/86. For these performances, Taijul was named Man of the Tournament. His NCL season for Rajshahi Division was less successful, with 18 wickets from seven matches, though this including a ten-wicket haul against Sylhet Division, for which he was named man of the match.

In October 2018, Taijul was named in the squad for the Khulna Titans team, following the draft for the 2018–19 Bangladesh Premier League. He was the leading wicket-taker for the team in the tournament, with thirteen dismissals in twelve matches. In August 2019, he was one of 35 cricketers named in a training camp ahead of Bangladesh's 2019–20 season. In November 2019, he was selected to play for the Rajshahi Royals in the 2019–20 Bangladesh Premier League.

International career

2014 to 2020
After Taijul's performances during the 2013–14 domestic season, he was named in Bangladesh A's 15-man squad for its tour of the West Indies in May 2014. Bangladesh's senior team also toured later in the year, in August and September 2014. Taijul was a late addition to Bangladesh's squad for the two-Test series, replacing another left-arm spinner, Abdur Razzak. On debut at Kingstown's Arnos Vale Ground (on Saint Vincent), he took 5/135 in the West Indies' first innings of 484/7 declared, bowling the majority of overs in tandem with Shuvagata Hom, an off-spinner also making his Test debut. Taijul thus became the sixth Bangladeshi bowler to take a five-wicket haul on his Test debut.

Taijul was subsequently selected for Bangladesh's home series against Zimbabwe, in October and November 2014. In the first Test of the three-Test series, he took 8/39 (his career best till now) from 16.5 overs in Zimbabwe's second innings, helping to bowl the side out for 114 runs. Taijul became the first Bangladeshi to take eight wickets in a Test innings, breaking Shakib Al Hasan's previous record (7/36 against New Zealand in 2008). Only two left-arm bowlers have recorded better figures in a Test innings – Sri Lanka's Rangana Herath (9/127) and England's Johnny Briggs (8/11). Later in the match, Taijul featured in an unbroken 19-run partnership for the eighth wicket, hitting the winning runs as Bangladesh won by three wickets. He was subsequently named man of the match.

Making his One Day International debut for Bangladesh against Zimbabwe on 1 December 2014, Taijul finished with figures of 4/11 from seven overs, including a hat-trick. He became the fourth Bangladeshi to take an ODI hat-trick, after Shahadat Hossain, Abdur Razzak, and Rubel Hossain, and the first to take a hat-trick in ODI debut. At the 2015 World Cup played in Australia and New Zealand, Taijul was included in Bangladesh's squad, but played only a single match, taking 0/58 against New Zealand. He was dropped from the squad for the team's next international ODI series, when Pakistan toured in April and May 2015, but was named in the squad for the two-Test series. In the first Test in Khulna, Taijul took 6/163 in Pakistan's only innings, the second-best figures by a Bangladeshi bowler against Pakistan (after Shakib Al Hasan's 6/82 in 2011).

In April 2018, he was one of ten cricketers to be awarded a central contract by the Bangladesh Cricket Board (BCB) ahead of the 2018 season. In September 2019, he was named in Bangladesh's Twenty20 International (T20I) squad for the 2019–20 Bangladesh Tri-Nation Series. He made his T20I debut for Bangladesh, against Zimbabwe, on 13 September 2019, taking a wicket with his first delivery.

2021 to present
In May 2022, he was included in the Test and ODI squad of Bangladesh for West Indies tour. He was not included in the playing XI for the Test series and in the first two ODI matches. He was included in the playing XI for the third ODI, making his comeback in ODI since he last played against Zimbabwe in March 2020. In the match, he picked up his first five-wicket haul conceding 28 runs, his best bowling figure in ODIs. His bowling helped Bangladesh sweep the ODI series by a 3–0 margin.

See also
 List of Bangladesh cricketers who have taken five-wicket hauls on Test debut
 List of One Day International cricket hat-tricks

References

External links 
 

1992 births
Living people
Bangladeshi cricketers
Bangladesh Test cricketers
Bangladesh One Day International cricketers
Bangladesh Twenty20 International cricketers
Rajshahi Division cricketers
Rajshahi Royals cricketers
Cricketers who have taken five wickets on Test debut
People from Natore District
One Day International hat-trick takers
Cricketers at the 2015 Cricket World Cup
Fortune Barishal cricketers
Sylhet Strikers cricketers
Khulna Tigers cricketers
Prime Doleshwar Sporting Club cricketers
Legends of Rupganj cricketers
Prime Bank Cricket Club cricketers
Bangladesh North Zone cricketers
Bangladesh under-23 cricketers